Françoise David  (born January 13, 1948) is a former spokesperson of Québec solidaire – a left-wing, feminist, and sovereigntist political party in the province of Quebec, Canada. She was elected to serve as the Member of the National Assembly of Quebec for the riding of Gouin in the 2012 Quebec election, and then again in the 2014 Quebec election.  Quebec Solidaire was born from the merger of Option Citoyenne with l'Union des Forces Progressistes. She is the author of the book/manifesto Bien commun recherché – une option citoyenne (over 7,000 copies sold in Quebec) which attempts to combine the concepts of "common good", social justice, ecology and economic democracy into a coherent political doctrine. On January 19, 2017, Françoise David announced her immediate retirement as both party spokesperson and as a Member of the National Assembly due to her health.

Biography
In 1987, Françoise David became coordinator for the Regroupement des centres de femmes du Québec. Seven years later, she was named president of the Fédération des femmes du Québec (FFQ). In this capacity, she ensured that women's issues, including poverty and violence against women, remained at the forefront in Canada. She is the daughter of cardiologist and Progressive Conservative Senator Paul David. Her grandfather Athanase David was a Liberal Senator. She is also the sister of political science professor and director of Raoul-Dandurand Chair, Charles-Philippe David.

Two of her best-recognised public successes have been the 1995 Women's March against Poverty and the 2000 World March of Women against Poverty and Violence.

In addition to her work experience, Françoise David is a member of numerous community organizations. In January 2000, she participated in the non-governmental observation mission to Iraq, and in December 2001 she traveled to Mali with the Canadian University Service Overseas.

In 1999, she was made a Knight of the National Order of Quebec. In 2002, she was awarded the Governor General's Award in Commemoration of the Persons Case.

David ran in the riding of Gouin in central Montreal in the 2007 Quebec election, finishing second to the PQ incumbent Nicolas Girard. David received 7913 votes, amounting to 26% of the vote in her riding, behind Girard's 11,318 votes (37%). Quebec Solidaire received 3.7% of the vote provincewide.

David ran in Gouin a second time in the 2008 Quebec election, receiving 7987 votes, or approximately 32% of the total, but again losing out to Girard, who received 10,276 votes (41%). Quebec Solidaire received 3.8% of the vote provincewide and David's co-leader Amir Khadir won the party's first seat in the National Assembly of Quebec in the neighbouring riding of Mercier.

In the 2012 Quebec election, David was elected for the first time. She was re-elected in 2014, her party winning the most seats in its history.

Her younger sister, Hélène David, was elected as a Liberal MNA for the provincial riding of Outremont in the 2014 Quebec election. David holds a PhD in psychology and since 1984 she was an instructor and vice-rector at the University. From 2008 to 2010 she was Assistant Deputy Minister for higher education in the Quebec Ministry of Education, Recreation & Sport under Premier Jean Charest. When asked if her sister Françoise tried to persuade her to join Québec solidaire, Hélène said that the two have "known for a long time that we're not necessarily from the same political family." Unlike Françoise, Hélène is a federalist.

Françoise David is married to François Larose, with whom she had one child.

Electoral record

* Result compared to Action démocratique

* Result compared to UFP

References

External links

 Official Website of Québec Solidaire

1948 births
People from Outremont, Quebec
Québec solidaire MNAs
French Quebecers
Knights of the National Order of Quebec
Living people
Quebec political party leaders
Women MNAs in Quebec
Canadian feminists
Female Canadian political party leaders
Politicians from Montreal
Canadian socialists
Canadian socialist feminists
21st-century Canadian politicians
21st-century Canadian women politicians
Francoise
Université de Montréal alumni
Canadian atheists
Governor General's Award in Commemoration of the Persons Case winners